Thomas David may refer to:

 Tommy David (born 1948), Welsh rugby union and rugby league player
 Thomas Christian David (1925–2006), Austrian composer, conductor and flutist